El Malah is a district in Aïn Témouchent Province, Algeria. It was named after its capital, El Malah.

Municipalities
The district is further divided into 4 municipalities:
El Malah
Ouled Kihal
Terga
Chaabet El Ham

References 

Districts of Aïn Témouchent Province